Pol Cruchten (30 July 1963 – 3 July 2019) was a Luxembourgish film director and producer. His film Hochzäitsnuecht was screened in the Un Certain Regard section at the 1992 Cannes Film Festival.

Filmography
 Somewhere in Europe (1988)
 Hochzaeitsnuecht (1992)
 Sniper (1994)
 Black Dju (1996)
 Boys on the Run (2001)
 Perl oder Pica (2006)
 Universalove (2008 - producer only)
 Never Die Young (2013)
 Voices from Chernobyl (2016)

References

External links

1963 births
2019 deaths
Luxembourgian film directors
Luxembourgian film producers
People from Pétange